Tanner Pearson (born August 10, 1992) is a Canadian professional ice hockey player for the Vancouver Canucks of the National Hockey League (NHL). Pearson was drafted 30th overall in the 2012 NHL Entry Draft by the Los Angeles Kings.

Playing career

Professional

Los Angeles Kings (2013–2018)

Pearson played major junior hockey with the Barrie Colts in the Ontario Hockey League. On August 3, 2012, Pearson signed a three-year entry-level contract with the Los Angeles Kings, who had drafted him with the last pick of the first round (30th overall) in the 2012 NHL Entry Draft.

In 2013, the Kings recalled Pearson after completion of his first professional season with affiliate, the Manchester Monarchs of the American Hockey League, to be one of their "black aces" on their taxi squad during the Stanley Cup playoffs. On May 18, 2013, he played right wing on the Kings fourth line in his first NHL game in a playoff game against the San Jose Sharks. On December 3, 2013, Pearson was sent back down to Manchester. On June 13, 2014 Pearson helped lead the Kings to a Stanley Cup victory over the New York Rangers.

In the 2014–15 season, Pearson played a majority of the season with Jeff Carter and Tyler Toffoli, with the line being dubbed "That 70s Line" since all three had numbers in the 70s. Pearson was injured on January 10, 2015, suffering a broken left leg during a game against the Winnipeg Jets. The injury would cause Pearson to miss the remainder of the 2014–15 season. On April 2, 2015, Pearson signed a two-year contract extension worth $2.8 million.

In October 2016, Pearson was suspended for four games for an illegal hit to the head of Brandon Davidson.

As an impending restricted free agent following the 2016–17 season, having established career bests with 24 goals and 44 points, Pearson agreed to a four-year contract extension worth $15 million on May 8, 2017. Pearson through the first year of his new contract in 2017–18 season, was one of four Kings skaters to appear in all 82 games, he ranked sixth in scoring with 15 goals and 40 points.

With the Kings off to slow start to start the 2018–19 season, Pearson mirrored the Kings struggles by registering just 1 assist through 17 games.

Pittsburgh Penguins (2018–2019)
On November 14, 2018, Pearson ended his seven-year tenure with the Kings as he was traded to the Pittsburgh Penguins in exchange for Carl Hagelin.

Vancouver Canucks (2019–present)
On February 25, 2019, the Penguins traded Pearson to the Vancouver Canucks in exchange for Erik Gudbranson.

On April 8, 2021, Pearson signed a three-year, $9.75 million extension with the Canucks.

On November 9, 2021 Pearson suffered a hand injury and underwent surgery. On Jan. 12, the Canucks organization announced via Twitter that the winger had undergone his third hand surgery since November, and would miss the remainder of the 2022-23 season. 

When asked about the injury on January 12, Pearson's teammate Quinn Hughes stated that it was "not handled properly" but later clarified that he didn't intend to blame anyone for Pearson's setbacks saying "I'm emotional just like everyone else. I wasn't trying to direct blame at anyone. I don't think it's really anyone's fault, it's just an unfortunate situation." On January 13, the Canucks began an internal investigation into how the team handled Pearson's injury. It was also reported that the NHLPA has been looking into the situation.

International play

Pearson played for Canada at the 2012 World Junior Ice Hockey Championships, where he was a part of the bronze medal winning team.

Personal life
Pearson grew up in Kitchener, Ontario, with his sister Ali and parents Kim and Tim Pearson. His father and sister were both involved in hockey; his father worked for equipment company Bauer Hockey and his sister worked for the Kitchener Rangers.

Pearson married his longtime girlfriend Meaghan Loveday in the summer of 2018.

Career statistics

Regular season and playoffs

International

Awards and honours

References

External links
 

1992 births
Living people
Barrie Colts players
Canadian expatriate ice hockey players in the United States
Canadian ice hockey left wingers
Ice hockey people from Ontario
Los Angeles Kings draft picks
Los Angeles Kings players
Manchester Monarchs (AHL) players
National Hockey League first-round draft picks
Pittsburgh Penguins players
Sportspeople from Kitchener, Ontario
Stanley Cup champions
Vancouver Canucks players